Herman Wrice (1939–2000) was a renowned community organizer in Philadelphia, Pennsylvania and inventor of the Wrice Process method of direct action, whereby neighbors directly confront street-level drug dealers in their communities.

In 1988, Herman organized Mantua Against Drugs (MAD). In a white hard-hat, provided by Mayor Wilson Goode, Herman began the demolition and closing of crack houses and led marches against drug dealers who operated freely on street comers in Mantua. He often faced death threats; he was not only fearless, he once taunted the drug dealers to come get him while he worked cleaning a street comer park. They didn't. He put up "Wanted" posters with pictures of the Dealer of the Week. Herman's methods were adopted by other communities in Philadelphia. His message: "Stand up to them and they’ll leave."

Philadelphia police took notice and began helping Herman. Soon communities saw that the police were there to help get rid of dealers. Herman observed, "Communities (had) thought the police were the enemy — and the dealers loved it."

Wrice died of a heart attack on March 10, 2000.

References

External links
Mural Mural (image)

1939 births
2000 deaths
American activists
Law enforcement in the United States